The Council of Australian Humanist Societies (CAHS) is an umbrella organisation for Australian humanist societies. It was founded in 1965. It is affiliated with Humanists International. The official symbol of CAHS (and all member organisations) is the Happy Human.

Activities
CAHS holds conventions and publishes on humanism.

CAHS accepts Humanist International's Minimum statement on Humanism
Humanism is a democratic and ethical life stance, which affirms that human beings have the right and responsibility to give meaning and shape to their own lives. It stands for the building of a more humane society through an ethic based on human and other natural values in the spirit of reason and free inquiry through human capabilities. It is not theistic, and it does not accept supernatural views of reality.

See also

Agnosticism
Amsterdam Declaration 2002
Atheism
Atheist Foundation of Australia
Fusion Party (Australia)
Human rights in Australia
Humanism and Its Aspirations
Irreligion in Australia
Major world religions
Rationalism
Rationalist Society of Australia
Reason Party (Australia)
Religion in Australia - includes Australian Bureau of Statistics census information relating to religion and belief.
Secular state
Secularism
Separation of church and state in Australia
Separation of church and state
States and territories of Australia
The Secular Party of Australia

References

Humanist associations
Secularism in Australia
Secularist organizations
Council of Australian Humanist Societies
Humanist

External links

Australian Bureau of Statistics 1996 Census Dictionary - Religion category
Australian Bureau of Statistics 2001 Census Dictionary - religion category
Year Book Australia, 2006. Religious Affiliation section from Australian Bureau of Statistics. Much of the text of Religion in Australia is taken from here (or previous versions).
CAHS Website
ACT Humanist Society Website
Human Rights Brief No. 3 Assessment of international law pertaining to freedom of religion and belief from Australian Human Rights and Equal Opportunity Commission.